Agha ("chief, master, lord") is an honorific title for a civilian or officer, or often part of such title. In the Ottoman times, some court functionaries and leaders of organizations like bazaar or the janissary units were entitled to the agha title. In rural communities, this term is used for people who own considerable lands and are influential in their community. Regardless of a rural community, this title is also used for any male that is influential or respected.

Etymology
The word agha entered English from Turkish, and the Turkish word comes from the Old Turkic aqa, meaning "elder brother". It is an equivalent of Mongolian word aqa or aka.

Other uses 
"Agha" is nowadays used as a common Persian honorific title for men, the equivalent of "mister" in English. The corresponding honorific term for women is khanum.

See also

State organisation of the Ottoman Empire
Agaluk
Aga Khan
Agha of the Janissaries
Kapi Agha
Kizlar Agha
Silahdar Agha

References

Court titles
Government of the Ottoman Empire
Ottoman titles
Titles in Iran
Titles of national or ethnic leadership
Titles in Lebanon
Military ranks of the Ottoman Empire
Janissaries
Titles in Bosnia and Herzegovina during Ottoman period